Natalia Nikolayevna Ivanova (born 1 September 1971) is a Russian taekwondo practitioner and Olympic medalist. She competed at the 2000 Summer Olympics in Sydney where she received a silver medal in the +67 kg class. She won a silver medal in heavyweight at the 1997 World Taekwondo Championships in Hong Kong, after defeating Chiu Meng-jen in the semifinal, and being defeated by Jung Myoung-sook in the final. She also competed at the 1995, 1999, 2001 and 2003 World Taekwondo Championships. She won gold medals at the 1996, 1998 and 2002 European Taekwondo Championships.

References

External links

1971 births
Living people
Russian female taekwondo practitioners
Taekwondo practitioners at the 2000 Summer Olympics
Olympic silver medalists for Russia
Olympic taekwondo practitioners of Russia
People from Usolye-Sibirskoye
Olympic medalists in taekwondo
Medalists at the 2000 Summer Olympics
Sportspeople from Irkutsk Oblast
European Taekwondo Championships medalists
World Taekwondo Championships medalists
21st-century Russian women
20th-century Russian women